All Stars is a 2013 British dance film directed by Ben Gregor. The film was released in the United Kingdom on 3 May 2013, and stars Theo Stevenson as one of two children trying to save their youth centre.

Synopsis
When their youth centre is threatened with Closure, six children decide to come together and put on a dance show. Each has their own reason for performing aside from saving the youth centre. Jaden (Akai) loves to dance but is forbidden to do so by his scholastically motivated parents (Javine Hylton & Ashley Walters). Ethan (Theo Stevenson) hopes to impress the girl of his dreams. Amy (Fleur Houdijk) holds a secret crush on Ethan and hopes to use this as an outlet for the emotions she has from taking care of her father, who is suffering from depression. They're helped along by Brian (Gamal Toseafa),  Tim (Dominic Herman-Day), and Rebecca (Amelia Clarkson), and they all hope to manage to save the centre and make their hopes come true.

Cast
 Theo Stevenson as Ethan
 Akai as Jaden
 Ashley Jensen as Gina
 Fleur Houdijk as Amy
 Dominic Herman-Day as Tim
 Amelia Clarkson as Rebecca
 Gamal Toseafa as Brian
 Summer Davies as Sadie
 Kimberley Walsh as Trish, Ethan’s mum 
 Kieran Lai as Kurt
 Ashley Walters as Mark, Jaden’s Dad
 Javine Hylton as Kelly, Jaden’s Mum
 Kevin Bishop as Andy, Ethan’s Dad
 Mark Heap as Simon Tarrington

Reception
Critical reception for All Stars was mixed. On Rotten Tomatoes it has an approval rating of 43% based on reviews from 23 critics. Den of Geek panned the film and wrote "Very young kids might find some enjoyment in All Stars, but it's corny, light-entertainment cinema at its most irritating."

References

External links
 

2013 films
Entertainment One films
Vertigo Films films
2010s dance films
British dance films
2010s English-language films
2010s British films